Kim Christy (born 1950) was a female impersonator of the 1960s and 1970s, magazine editor and publisher, book author, screenwriter, adult film producer, and first genderfluid person to be inducted into the AVN Hall of Fame.

Early life

Christy was born Ken Olsen to Gertie Olsen and her husband in the Bronx, New York. Christy was raised in the Bronx, where he attended Catholic school at Our Lady of Mount Carmel's Church (Bronx). He began dressing in semi-drag and going out in public at age 14. At age 15, he met Billy Schumacher, whose drag name was International Chrysis, at the Tenth of Always, a bar. In 1964, when the two appeared, in drag, in Life magazine by chance, Christy's parents reacted poorly, ushering him out of the house "within a year or two." Christy and Chrysis came to share a small apartment on Mott Street, near Broome Street and Houston, in what later became known as SoHo in New York.

Career
Christy first became a model with the help of Lenny Burtman, an editor for the fetish magazine Exotique. She then became a stripper and showgirl at Club 82. She toured the United States as a female impersonator, subsequently working as a photographer for the publications Mode Avantgarde, Hooker, Eros, and Exposé. She eventually became editor of the publication Female Mimics and the aforementioned Exotique. Part of Female Mimics was the She-Male calendar. Years later, he edited the original Exotique issues into book form, then published a historical survey of sex and fetish images called The Christy Report (2001).

Awards
Best Fetish Producer (1998)
Adult Video News Hall Of Fame inductee (2004)

Filmography
Though Christy's full filmography is unknown, some relics of his work remain online.

References

LGBT people from New York (state)
People from the Bronx
Male-to-female cross-dressers
AVN Award winners
American drag queens
People from SoHo, Manhattan
1950 births
Living people
Genderfluid people
Non-binary drag performers